Ignacio Perrín (born 20 January 1985) is an Argentine professional boxer. As an amateur, he competed in the men's lightweight event at the 2016 Summer Olympics.

References

External links
 

1985 births
Living people
Argentine male boxers
Olympic boxers of Argentina
Boxers at the 2016 Summer Olympics
South American Games bronze medalists for Argentina
South American Games medalists in boxing
Competitors at the 2010 South American Games
Featherweight boxers
Lightweight boxers
People from San Fernando de la Buena Vista
Sportspeople from Buenos Aires Province